Victor (formerly Morning Shade) is an unincorporated community in Freeman Township, Pope County, Arkansas, United States. It is located on Victor Road within the Ozark National Forest.

References

Unincorporated communities in Pope County, Arkansas
Unincorporated communities in Arkansas